The 1981 Liège–Bastogne–Liège was the 67th edition of the Liège–Bastogne–Liège cycle race and was held on 16 April 1981. The race started and finished in Liège. The race was won by Josef Fuchs of the Cilo–Aufina team.

General classification

Notes

References

1981
1981 in Belgian sport
April 1981 sports events in Europe
1981 Super Prestige Pernod